Otis "Jet" Johnson (born February 3, 1932) was an American athlete who competed mainly in sprint events. Running under coach Edward P. Hurt he was a key component of the Morgan State relay teams.  From 1953 to 1955, he was the national outdoor champion and a three-time winner of the Penn Relays. Johnson later served in the U.S. Army.

References

External links
 "Edward Hurt." USA Track and Field. Retrieved 2013-10-16.  http://www.legacy.usatf.org/HallOfFame/TF/showBio.asp?HOFIDs=78
 Wade, Herman L. (2004-06-01). Run From There. United States: Word Association. p. 211..  http://wordassociation.com/runfromthere/index.htm 
 http://www.theciaa.com/information/hall_of_fame/130124_hall_of_fame_class
 http://www.morganstatebears.com/hof.aspx
 http://www.morganstatebears.com/hof.aspx?hof=66&path=&kiosk=

1932 births
Living people
Track and field athletes from Philadelphia
American male sprinters
African-American male track and field athletes
Morgan State Bears men's track and field athletes
United States Army soldiers
21st-century African-American people
20th-century African-American sportspeople